Weronika Biela  (born 15 September 1991) is a Polish snowboarder.
 
She competed in the 2013, 2015 and 2017 FIS Snowboard World Championships, and in the 2018 Winter Olympics, in parallel giant slalom.

References

External links

1991 births
Living people
Polish female snowboarders
Olympic snowboarders of Poland
Snowboarders at the 2018 Winter Olympics
Snowboarders at the 2022 Winter Olympics
Sportspeople from Zakopane
Universiade gold medalists for Poland
Universiade medalists in snowboarding
Competitors at the 2017 Winter Universiade
Competitors at the 2015 Winter Universiade
21st-century Polish women